Cnestrognophos is a genus of moth in the family Geometridae.

Selected species

Cnestrognophos mutilata
Cnestrognophos pentheri

References
Natural History Museum Lepidoptera genus database

Gnophini